Laranjeiras do Sul is a municipality in the state of Paraná in the Southern Region of Brazil.

It was once the territorial capital of Iguaçu.

See also
List of municipalities in Paraná

References
 News from Laranjeiras do Sul

Municipalities in Paraná